World's Edge Studio, LLC is an American video game developer and a studio of Xbox Game Studios based in Redmond, Washington. They were established in 2019 to oversee the Age of Empires franchise. The studio works with external studios such as Forgotten Empires, Tantalus Media and Relic Entertainment to bring back the franchise.

History 

At E3 2019 Xbox announced that they are establishing a new internal studio which later named World's Edge. The studio was established in 2019 by Adam Isgreen and Shannon Loftis to work on the Age of Empires franchise.

The studio's first title was Age of Empires II: Definitive Edition for which they partnered with Forgotten Empires, Tantalus Media and Wicked Witch Software. They worked as an overseer to make sure the title was in the right direction.

Shannon Loftis, one of the founders and head of the studio retired in 2022 and Michael Mann the executive producer of Age of Empires IV took her place.

On the 25th anniversary of Age of Empires, World's Edge announced an Xbox console port of Age of Empires II: Definitive Edition, and Age of Empires IV. Also announced was a remaster of Age of Mythology and the global version of Age of Empires Mobile.

Games developed

References 

American companies established in 2019
Companies based in Redmond, Washington
First-party video game developers
Microsoft subsidiaries
Video game companies established in 2019
Video game companies of the United States
Video game development companies
Xbox Game Studios
2019 establishments in Washington (state)